Eric William Fenby OBE (22 April 190618 February 1997) was an English composer, conductor, pianist, organist and teacher who is best known for being Frederick Delius's amanuensis from 1928 to 1934. He helped Delius realise a number of works that would not otherwise have been forthcoming.

Fenby was born in Scarborough, North Yorkshire, and as a youth took lessons in the piano, organ and cello. At the age of 12 he was appointed organist at Holy Trinity Church. As a composer he was largely self-taught. By 1925 he had conducted a work for string orchestra at the Spa Grand Hall in Scarborough and had written some minor pieces.

Working for Delius

In 1928, hearing that Delius had become virtually helpless because of blindness and paralysis (due to syphilis), he offered to serve him as an amanuensis. Fenby worked, at the composer's home in Grez-sur-Loing, near Paris, for extended periods until Delius died almost six years later. The project was taxing not only because of the need to devise a unique mode of musical communication but also because of Delius's difficult temperament and atheism. 

Although born into a Methodist household, Fenby had become a devout Catholic. The strain on him was intensified by the requirement to act as nurse during the composer's final days. Further responsibilities followed, including visiting Delius's severely ill widow, Jelka Rosen, and accompanying the composer's exhumed body back to England for burial. The whole experience left him "completely burnt out". In 1936, he published an account, Delius As I Knew Him.

The works he helped Delius to write (all for orchestra unless otherwise shown) are:
 A Song of Summer
 Fantastic Dance
 Irmelin prelude
 Caprice and Elegy (cello and chamber orchestra)
 Violin Sonata No. 3 (violin and piano)
 Songs of Farewell (double choir and orchestra)
 Idyll (soprano, baritone and orchestra).

This episode in Fenby's and Delius's lives was portrayed in Ken Russell's 1968 production for the BBC, Song of Summer, which can be found on YouTube. In 1980 Kate Bush sang about them in her song "Delius". In a much distorted form, the Delius-Fenby collaboration also serves as a basis for the fictional Ayrs-Frobisher collaboration in David Mitchell's novel Cloud Atlas.

Later career

After Delius's death Fenby entered the employ of the music publisher Boosey & Hawkes. He was contracted to write the score for Alfred Hitchcock's Jamaica Inn, (from Daphne du Maurier's novel), but his film career was interrupted by the Second World War. After joining the Royal Artillery he was transferred to the Education Corps at Bulford, where he conducted the Southern Command Orchestra. He was later commissioned to run Royal Army Education Corps courses in Lancashire.

Having left the Catholic Church, Fenby married Rowena C. T. Marshall (daughter of a Scarborough vicar) in 1944. They had a son, Roger, and a daughter, Ruth.

After the war Fenby founded the music department of the North Riding Training College. He was artistic director for the Bradford Delius Festival in 1962. He then became Professor of Harmony at the Royal Academy of Music in London from 1964 until 1977.

Fenby died in Scarborough, having returned to Catholicism in his final years.

Honours
Fenby was appointed an Officer of the Order of the British Empire (OBE) in 1962 for his artistic 
direction of the 1962 Delius Centenary Festival in Bradford.  He was appointed President of the Delius Society that same year.

He was awarded honorary doctorates from the universities of Bradford and Warwick (UK), and Jacksonville (USA).

Recordings and films

As a conductor and pianist Fenby made numerous recordings, including the definitive performances found in the Fenby Legacy double LP for Unicorn Records. Fenby recorded all three of Delius's violin sonatas, first with Ralph Holmes and later with Yehudi Menuhin, and Delius's Cello Sonata with Julian Lloyd Webber.

He was adviser to Ken Russell for the 1968 film Song of Summer, in which Fenby is portrayed by Christopher Gable. He was also the subject of a documentary film by Yorkshire Television called Song of Farewell.

Works
Always a severe self-critic, he destroyed several substantial early works but the following smaller pieces survive.

Orchestral works 
 Overture "Rossini on Ilkla Moor" (1938) ASV CD WHL2126
 Slow march "Lion Limb" (1952)
 "Two Aquarelles"

Choral works 
 "Magnificat and Nunc Dimittis" (1932)
 "For music on the eve of Palm Sunday" (1933, words by Robert Nichols)

References

Sources
Eric Fenby – Obituary, The Times, London, 22 February 1997

Richard Stoker, "Fenby, Eric William (1906–1997)", Oxford Dictionary of National Biography, Oxford University Press, 2004 accessed 13 June 2007
Eric Blom ed., Grove's Dictionary of Music and Musicians, 5th edition (1954)

External links

"Eric Fenby: Unsung Hero of Music" – site includes biography, discography, photos, sound files, links and other information.

1906 births
1997 deaths
Military personnel from Yorkshire
20th-century classical composers
Academics of the Royal Academy of Music
British Army personnel of World War II
English classical composers
English Roman Catholics
Light music composers
Royal Army Educational Corps officers
Officers of the Order of the British Empire
People from Scarborough, North Yorkshire
Honorary Members of the Royal Philharmonic Society
20th-century English composers
English male classical composers
Amanuenses
20th-century British male musicians
Royal Artillery personnel